Barwon Downs is a town in Victoria, Australia. The township was proclaimed on 10 May 1910.

The main industries in the area are agriculture, forestry and tourism.  The town has a church, tennis courts and public hall.  Barwon Downs also has a local Country Fire Authority (CFA) with members from the local community. Since the 1990s an aquifer in the Barwon Downs area have been used as a supply of water for Geelong in periods of drought.

References

External links

Towns in Victoria (Australia)